Bannard is a surname. Notable people with the surname include:

John Bannard (fl. 1412), British friar
Otto T. Bannard (1854–1929), American attorney, businessman, and philanthropist
Walter Darby Bannard (1934–2016), American abstract painter
W. H. Bannard (1875–1913), American football player and coach

See also
Barnard